The 2019 Murray Trophy – Glasgow was a professional tennis tournament played on indoor hard courts. It was the second edition of the tournament which was part of the 2019 ATP Challenger Tour. It took place in Glasgow, United Kingdom, between 16 and 22 September 2019.

Singles main-draw entrants

Seeds

1 Rankings are as of 9 September 2019.

Other entrants
The following players received wildcards into the singles main draw:
  Felix Gill
  Luke Johnson
  Aidan McHugh 
  Harry Wendelken
  Mark Whitehouse

The following player received entry into the singles main draw using a protected ranking:
  Maximilian Neuchrist

The following players received entry into the singles main draw as alternates:
  Harri Heliövaara
  Sem Verbeek

The following players received entry from the qualifying draw:
  Scott Duncan
  Jonathan Mridha

The following player received entry as a lucky loser:
  Karol Drzewiecki

Champions

Singles

 Emil Ruusuvuori def.  Alexandre Müller 6–3, 6–1.

Doubles

 Ruben Bemelmans /  Daniel Masur def.  Jamie Murray /  John-Patrick Smith 4–6, 6–3, [10–8].

References

2019 ATP Challenger Tour
2019
2019 in Scottish sport
September 2019 sports events in the United Kingdom
2010s in Glasgow